Nuntiella extenuata is a species of moth of the family Tortricidae. It is found in Shaanxi, China.

References

Moths described in 1971
Eucosmini